Fingal Film Festival is held yearly in Swords, Ireland since 2012.

Festival Awards 

This film festival awards prizes in nine categories (up from 6 categories in the first edition). Past winners are listed below

2012 
Best International Film - Colmillo - Venezuela 
Best Feature Film - Where The Sea Used To Be - Ireland 
Best Documentary - Sunday In Brazzaville - Spain & Congo 
Best Animation - Pixelation Daydreams - Ireland 
Best Newcomer Writer in Fingal - Steven Murray (Situations Vacant) - Ireland 
Best Short Film - Two Hearts - Ireland

2013 
Best International Film - Substitute Teacher - Israel 
Best Animated Film - Luminaris - Spain & Argentina 
Best Short Film -Is This It? - Ireland 
Best Feature Film - The Pier - Ireland 
Best Documentary Film - Beyond Right and Wrong - USA 
Best Newcomer Director/Writer in Fingal - Special Delivery - Ireland 
Best Student Film/Doc/Animation - Kill Screen (BCFE) - Ireland

2014
Best Feature Film - Calloused Hands - UK/USA 
Best Documentar Feature - Dah života - Bosnia 
Best International Film - Electric Indigo - Belgium 
Best Student Film - I've Been a Sweeper (DIT/FN) - Ireland 
Best Irish Language Film - Barróg Béir - Ireland 
Best Animation Film - Shoot - Ireland 
Best Short Film - Skunky Dog - Ireland 
Best Fingal Newcomer -  Volkswagen Joe - Ireland

2015
Best International Film - Er und Sie -  Germany 
Best Short Film - Solitaire -  Ireland 
Best Feature Film - The Kids from the Marx and Engels Street - Montenegro 
Best Student Film - The Hiding (DIT) - Ireland 
Best Fingal Newcomer - Brenda - Ireland 
Best Animation - Deadly - Ireland 
Best Documentary - Where my Ladies? - Ireland 
Best Irish Language Film - An Cat - Ireland 
Outstanding Achievement in Media - 7 Days in Syria - USA

2016
Best 1916 Short - Proclaim! -  Ireland
Best Short Film - Deirdre -  Ireland 
Best Feature Film - South - Ireland
Best Student Film - Rapto - Ireland 
Best Fingal Newcomer - Cousins - Ireland 
Best Animation - Little Flower- Ireland 
Best Documentary - Murphy's Law - Canada
Scannán na hÉireann - Maidhm - Ireland 
Outstanding Achievement in Media - In Dialogue - USA

Awards

Fingal Community Award 
Fingal Film Festival Winners of the Fingal Community Award in the Arts and Culture Category 2013 Ireland

Irelands Event Industry Awards 
Short Listed for Irelands Event Industry Awards 2013 & 2015

External links 
 Official site
Facebook

References 

Film festivals in Ireland